Cristina García Ramos (born 14 September 1949) is a Spanish journalist.

She began her professional career at the Televisión Española (TVE) Production Center in the Canary Islands, where she appeared on programs such as Tele-Canarias and Panorama de Actualidad.

In 1979 she moved to Madrid to take over the presentation of Telediario 2nd edition. Later she would present the weekend edition, a job she held until 1983. Her news experience allowed her to broadcast live the events of the 23-F coup attempt.

In the following years she presented different programs on the public network, from the cultural to the economic: 300 millones, La víspera de nuestro tiempo, Dentro de un orden, etc.

Beginning in 1993, García Ramos presented and directed the premier gossip show on Spanish television: , a program which garnered her recognition and great popularity. In 2008, as a result of layoffs at TVE, she left the network after 30 years of service.

From her first marriage, with a TV cameraman, she has one daughter named Thais (born 1975), who is a sociologist and has given her two grandchildren. Cristina García Ramos is currently married to journalist .

TV career
 Tele-Canarias (1977), 
 Panorama de actualidad (1978), TVE
 Telediario (1979–1983), TVE
 300 millones (1982), TVE
 Esta semana (1982–1983), TVE
 La víspera de nuestro tiempo (1983–1984), TVE
 Dentro de un orden (1984–1986), TVE
 A través del espejo (1988–1990), TVE
  (1993–2008), TVE
 Sin secretos: Así somos los canarios (2009–2010), TV Canaria

References

External links
 

1949 births
Living people
People from Santa Cruz de Tenerife
Spanish television directors
Spanish television journalists
Spanish television presenters
Spanish women journalists
Women television directors
Spanish women television presenters